Reichenbachiella faecimaris is a bacterium from the genus of Reichenbachiella which has been isolated from tidal flat sediments from the Yellow Sea in Korea.

References

External links
Type strain of Reichenbachiella faecimaris at BacDive -  the Bacterial Diversity Metadatabase	

Cytophagia
Bacteria described in 2011